Miedza  is a village in the administrative district of Gmina Stawiszyn, within Kalisz County, Greater Poland Voivodeship, in west-central Poland.

The village has a population of 210.

References

Miedza